IFIP Working Group WG 2.10 on Software Architecture is a working group of the International Federation for Information Processing (IFIP).

Aim

The purpose of WG 2.10 is to further the practice of software architecture by integrating software architecture research and practice.

Software architecture is important because
 it captures and preserves designers' intentions about system structure, thereby providing a defense against design decay as a system ages
 it is the key to achieving intellectual control over the enormous complexity of a sophisticated system.

Some of the concerns of a software architect are
 early analysis of critical whole-system properties
 preservation of the integrity of design over time in the face of system modifications and the creation of families of related systems.

Scope

The aspects of software architecture within the working group's scope are:

 identifying common problems encountered by practitioners
 investigating notations, languages, techniques, tools, and methodologies for improving the practice of software architecture.
   
Current areas for improvement are:
 describing software architectures
 supporting reuse at the architectural level
 interoperability and integration
 evaluating and analyzing software architectures (e.g. for fulfillment of requirements or properties, comparing design alternatives, etc.)
 supporting the correspondence between the architecture and the implementation
 reverse-engineering the architecture of an implemented system
 training, education, and certification of software architects

The Software Architecture Portal
The IFIP WG 2.10 maintains the software architecture portal. The portal provides information about the working group, the Software Architecture Village wiki, and other resources on software architecture. 
The IFIP WG 2.10 is also active in organising the ICSA (previously WICSA) conference series.

References

Software architecture
International Federation for Information Processing